The 2012 Molson Cash Spiel was held from November 23 to 25 at the Duluth Curling Club in Duluth, Minnesota as part of the 2012–13 World Curling Tour. It was held in conjunction with the 2012 Coors Light Cash Spiel. The event was held in a round robin format, and the purse for the event was USD$7,200. In the final, Krista McCarville of Ontario defeated Becca Hamilton of Wisconsin with a score of 8–4 for her third title.

Teams
The teams are listed as follows:

Round-robin standings
Final round-robin standings

Playoffs
The playoffs draw is listed as follows:

References

External links

2012 in curling
Curling in Minnesota